"Around the World" is a song by English boy band East 17. Written by Brian Harvey, Tony Mortimer, Matt Rowe and Richard Stannard, it was released on 2 May 1994 as the lead single from the band's second album, Steam (1994). It became their fourth top-10 hit in the United Kingdom, charting at number three on the UK Singles Chart.

Critical reception
In his weekly UK chart commentary, James Masterton wrote that on the song, the band is "returning to the slick dancefloor balladry that first brought them to the Top 5 in the shape of "Deep". From here they can clearly only go from strength to strength." Pan-European magazine Music & Media commented, "East 17 has got the Walthamstow blues. The teen stars with street credibility can be "softies" too, suffering from homesickness while touring abroad as we learn from this ballad." Alan Jones from Music Week gave "All Around the World" four out of five, viewing it as "a polished, shuffling vehicle for the usual East 17 posturing and trademark touches, with a slow rap to the fore and a subtle melody, Just what fans ordered, in fact."

Music video
The accompanying music video for "Around the World" shows the band performing underground and also in a forest. It received heavy rotation on MTV Europe and was A-listed on Germany's VIVA.

Charts

Weekly charts

Year-end charts

Certifications

References

1990s ballads
1994 singles
1994 songs
East 17 songs
Song recordings produced by Richard Stannard (songwriter)
Songs written by Brian Harvey
Songs written by Richard Stannard (songwriter)
Songs written by Tony Mortimer